Dichomeris derasella is a moth of the family Gelechiidae. It is found in most of Europe, except Ireland, Norway, Sweden, the Iberian Peninsula and part of the Balkan Peninsula.

The wingspan is 21–22 mm. Adults are on wing from mid-April to the end of May in one generation per year.

The larvae feed on Cerasus, Crataegus, Malus sylvestris and Rubus. They live within a spun or rolled leaf. The species overwinters in the pupal stage.

References

Moths described in 1775
derasella
Moths of Europe
Moths of Asia